Alfonso Basilio Ghetaldo, O.S.B. (1647–1702) was a Roman Catholic prelate who served as Bishop of Stagno (1694–1702).

Biography
Alfonso Basilio Ghetaldo was born in Ragusa in 1647 and ordained a priest in the Order of Saint Benedict.
On 19 July 1694, he was appointed during the papacy of Pope Innocent XII as Bishop of Stagno.
On 25 July 1694, he was consecrated bishop by Galeazzo Marescotti, Cardinal-Priest of Santi Quirico e Giulitta, with Prospero Bottini, Titular Archbishop of Myra, and Stefano Giuseppe Menatti, Titular Bishop of Cyrene, with serving as co-consecrators. 
He served as Bishop of Stagno until his death on 12 September 1702.

References 

17th-century Roman Catholic bishops in Croatia
18th-century Roman Catholic bishops in Croatia
Bishops appointed by Pope Innocent XII
1647 births
1702 deaths
Benedictine bishops
Croatian bishops
18th-century Roman Catholic bishops in the Holy Roman Empire